Geum Min is a South Korean politician. He was a Socialist Party delegate from 2006 until 2008. He also came forward as a candidate in the 17th presidential election.

See also 
 Hong Sehwa

References

External links 
 Geum Min's website 
  
  

1962 births
Living people
People from Busan
Socialist Party (South Korea) politicians
Labor Party (South Korea)
South Korean left-wing activists
Geum clan of Bonghwa